Mannur is a village and gram panchayat in the Palakkad district, state of Kerala, India.

Demographics
 India census, Mannur had a population of 19,805 with 9,410 males and 10,395 females. Literacy rate of 15,878 with 8,023 females and 7,855 males

Mannur's Pin Code is 678642

References

Gram panchayats in Palakkad district
Villages in Palakkad district